Nicolas Petit is a French and American dog musher. He competes in the Iditarod Trail Sled Dog Race and has finished in the top ten a number of times, including in 2013, 2015, 2016, 2017, and 2018 (when he finished in second place). He won the Copper Basin 300, Knik 200, Kobuk 440, and Tustumena 200 in 2018.

Petit spent his early days in Normandy and moved to New Mexico in 1992 and to Alaska in 2000.

References 

Year of birth missing (living people)
Living people
American dog mushers
French athletes